Mexico–Mongolia relations are the diplomatic relations between Mexico and Mongolia. Both nations are members of the Asia Pacific Parliamentary Forum and the United Nations.

History
On 24 September 1975 Mexico and Mongolia established diplomatic relations. Initially, relations between both nations were conducted via multilateral forums such as at the United Nations. In October 2001, Mexican President Vicente Fox paid an official visit to Mongolia where he met with Mongolian President Natsagiin Bagabandi. During the visit, both nations signed two bilateral agreements and discussed an expansion of bilateral cooperation. In 2003, Mongolia appointed an honorary consul based in Mexico City.

In May 2007, Mongolian Foreign Viceminister Bekhbat Khasbazaryn paid a visit to Mexico where he mentioned Mongolia's interest in Mexican investors taking advantage of the opportunities offered by Mongolia. He also stressed the need to explore new schemes aimed at strengthening bilateral cooperation in the trade and investment sectors, especially mining. In September 2016, Mongolian President Tsakhiagiin Elbegdorj arrived to Mexico on a private visit where he toured the cultural ruins of Teotihuacan and met with the President of the Mexico-Mongolia Friendship Council.

In January 2011, a delegation from Mexico, led by Senator Carlos Jiménez Macías assisted the Asia Pacific Parliamentary Forum being held in Ulaanbaatar. During the visit, the Mexican delegation met with Chairman of the State Great Khural, Damdiny Demberel where they discussed several bilateral topics. In 2015, both nations celebrated 40 years of diplomatic relations.

High-level visits
High-level visits from Mexico to Mongolia
 President Vicente Fox (2001)
 Senator Carlos Jiménez Macías (2011)

High-level visits from Mongolia to Mexico
 President of the Parliament Lkhamsuren Enebish (2001)
 Foreign Viceminister Bekhbat Khasbazaryn (2007)
 President Tsakhiagiin Elbegdorj (2016)

Bilateral agreements
Both nations have signed a few bilateral agreements such as an Agreement on Cultural Exchanges (1988); Memorandum of Understanding for the Establishment of a Mechanism for Policy Consultations between both nations (2001) and an Agreement for the Suppression of Visas in Diplomatic and Official Passports (2001).

Trade
In 2018, trade between Mexico and Mongolia totaled US$1.1 million. Mexico's main exports to Mongolia include: manufacturing parts, chemical based products, transport vehicles and three-wheels motorcycles. Mongolia's main exports to Mexico include: processors and controllers; integrated electronic circuits, hides and animal products.

Diplomatic missions
 Mexico is accredited to Mongolia from its embassy in Seoul, South Korea and maintains an honorary consulate in Ulaanbaatar.
 Mongolia is accredited to Mexico from its embassy in Washington, D.C., United States and maintains an honorary consulate in Mexico City.

References 

Mongolia
Mexico